Feng Pao-hsing (born 18 August 1982) is a Taiwanese football (soccer) player. He currently plays for Taiwan Power Company F.C. His usual position is defensive midfielder.

He played for the Chinese Taipei national football team in the 2010 FIFA World Cup qualifying rounds.

Career statistics

References

External links 

1982 births
Living people
Taiwan Power Company F.C. players
Taiwanese footballers
Taiwanese men's futsal players
Chinese Taipei international footballers
Association football midfielders